Rising Sun is the second Korean-language studio album by South Korean boy group TVXQ, released on through SM Entertainment on September 12, 2005. Musicians including Yoo Young-jin, Kenzie, Hwang Sung Je and All-4-One's Jamie Jones took part in the album's songwriting and production. The record yielded the singles "Rising Sun" and "Tonight", with both tracks having accompanying music videos.

Commercially, Rising Sun experienced success in South Korea. It was the fourth best-selling album in South Korea during 2005, selling over 222,000 copies. As of July 2012, the album has sold over 290,000 copies in the country.

Commercial performance 
The year 2007 is said to be K-pop's biggest slump in sales in South Korea, with the highest selling album by SG Wannabe at only 190,998 copies sold. TVXQ's "Rising Sun" still managed to make it onto the Korean Top 100 yearly charts, despite its release in 2005. It was the highest selling "old" album in 2007 with #67 position on the charts.

Singles

Rising Sun 
"Rising Sun" was announced as the album's title track on September 2, 2005. Its lyrics revolve around the gradual loss of purity and corruption of innocence that exists within humans, where it expresses human regret by comparing them to a disappearing sunset while containing the meaning of rediscovering the purity in human beings. Its music video received the Most Popular Music Video (daesang) prize at the 2005 Mnet KM Music Video Festival.

The Japanese version was included in the TVXQ's first Japanese album Heart, Mind and Soul, which was released in Japan in March 2006. On April 19, 2006, a physical edition of the song was released in Japan as a double A-side single titled "Rising Sun / Heart, Mind and Soul". In 2009, "Rising Sun" was featured in the Hollywood film Fast & Furious during Paul Walker's opening scene.

Accolades

Track listing

Charts

Weekly charts

Monthly charts

Yearly charts

Sales

Release history

References

2005 albums
TVXQ albums
SM Entertainment albums
Korean-language albums